Rusiate Matarerega (born 17 January 1993) is a Fijian footballer who plays as a forward for Nadi in the Fijian National Football League.

Club 

Cup: Fiji Football Association Cup Tournament, Inter-District Championship, Battle of the Giants and Champion versus Champion

International career

International goals
Scores and results list Fiji's goal tally first.

Private life
Matarerega is the son of former Lautoka, Nadi and Fiji national rep, Watisoni Voli.

References

1993 births
Living people
Fijian footballers
Nadi F.C. players
Suva F.C. players
Fiji international footballers
2016 OFC Nations Cup players
Association football forwards